Marith Anna Iedema (born 23 January 1989) is a Dutch journalist and writer. She lives and works in Amsterdam. Iedema produces a documentary series for Linda, and writes for magazines such as Nieuwe Revu, Grazia, and Glamour.

She published her first book (S)experimenteren with Prometheus in 2018. 
Due to its open discussion of controversial topics such as infidelity, female sexuality, and open relationships, (S)experimenteren received wide coverage in the Dutch and Belgian press.

She was born in Groningen.

(S)experimenteren
While Iedema was praised for further opening up the debate around female sexuality, she also received criticism. De Volkskrant argued in their review that Iedema's exploration of sexual themes was meaningless in the context of more “significant” global issues. Their statement: “like all women always and everywhere through all ages, she refuses to accept any kind of rejection and does not rest before she gets her way” received criticism for its implied sexism. Iedema responded with an open letter that the Volkskrant published in print in November 2018

References 

1989 births
Dutch women journalists
Writers from Amsterdam
People from Groningen (city)
Living people
21st-century Dutch women writers